Maxime Cosse (born 20 March 1992) is a Belgian professional footballer who plays as a forward for Belgian club RFC Huy. A two-footed attacker, he can operate in both flanks and behind the striker among other positions.

South Africa

Bolstering Free State Stars' attack for 2018, Cosse was assuaged by his debut in a 2-0 win over Baroka, coming on in the 76th minute for Goodman Dlamini after receiving his work permit.

Upon arrival, the Belgian winger was compared to South African Premier Division foreigners Gustavo Paez and Jeremy Brockie.

On 23 December 2019, Cosse joined Belgian club RFC Huy. In April 2020, he signed a pre-contract with Solières Sport for the upcoming 2020-21 season.

References

External links 
 

Association football forwards
1992 births
Belgian footballers
Belgian expatriate footballers
Association football wingers
Free State Stars F.C. players
K.V.K. Tienen-Hageland players
K. Patro Eisden Maasmechelen players
FC Strumska Slava Radomir players
Challenger Pro League players
Belgian Third Division players
South African Premier Division players
Second Professional Football League (Bulgaria) players
Living people
Expatriate soccer players in South Africa
Expatriate footballers in Oman
Expatriate footballers in Bulgaria
Belgian expatriate sportspeople in Bulgaria